Müssen is a municipality in the district of Lauenburg, in Schleswig-Holstein, Germany.

Müssen (Muessen, see also Meissen) translates literally as "Mosses" or commonly as "Marsh."

References

Municipalities in Schleswig-Holstein
Herzogtum Lauenburg